Karyugino is a rural locality (a village) in Krasnoyarsky Selsoviet, Ufimsky District, Bashkortostan, Russia. The population was 16 as of 2010. There are 3 streets.

Geography 
Karyugino is located 31 km north of Ufa (the district's administrative centre) by road. Krasny Yar is the nearest rural locality.

References 

Rural localities in Ufimsky District